Ken Webb is an English cyclist who at 42 claimed the world record for distance cycled in a year. Both records appeared in the Guinness Book of Records but were later removed.

World endurance record for distance cycled in a single year
In 1911 the weekly magazine, Cycling began a competition for the greatest distance cycled in a single year. The distance was untouched for more than 20 years. Then followed a succession of claims in the 1930s, including two by an Australian professional, Ossie Nicholson, one by a one-armed vegetarian named Walter Greaves and another by Charles de Gaulle's chauffeur, René Menzies. In 2016, under the supervision of the Ultra Marathon Cycling Association (UMCA), Kurt Searvogel (US) broke Tommy Godwin's record by riding 76,076 miles in one year. On 14 May 2017 Amanda Coker broke Searvogel's UMCA and Guinness World record when she finished her year with 86,573.2 miles (139,326.34 km).

The ride

Ken Webb, from Gossops Green, Sussex, intended to attempt the record when he retired after a working life that included 12 years with the Fleet Air Arm. Unemployment as a project engineer at 42 advanced his plans. He set off from Fleet Street, London, then the heart of the British newspaper industry, at noon on 1 September 1971.

Webb had little support from sponsors. By 10 November  he had run out of money and took a job at Gatwick Airport, near his home. He spoke of working there, riding  a day after work and sleeping two or three hours a night. He averaged better than  a day, sent witnessed postcards to Cycling'''s office to log his progress and used a different odometer each month to support the distance shown on the cards.

Webb rode one day with Keith Bingham, a reporter from Cycling. Bingham quoted Webb as saying: "People ask how it is that I account for a greater mileage between places than the road signs indicate. I tell them that I don't always ride straight from one place to the other, that sometimes I make detours - as you've seen this morning, Keith, when we went a few miles out of our way looking for the right road to Maldon. And what they don't seem to realise either is that when I arrive anywhere I might not seek anyone to sign a card until I've refreshed myself in a café, which is sometimes 30 minutes after stopping."

He finished the year record £134 in debt after cashing his life insurance policies, using his redundancy payments and using his pension fund. He completed his  ride outside Buckingham Palace after 448 days. He knew throughout his ride that he had doubters. He was followed at times by cyclists checking his riding and Cycling received calls asking what he had claimed. His distances appeared in the Guinness Book of Records but vanished from later editions.

After the ride
Webb insisted that he had ridden the distance, that he sent thousands of check cards to Cycling, and that his 13 odometers had been sealed by their maker and returned for checking. He said he wrote to the editor of the Guinness Book of Records'' to ask why his name had been deleted but that he got no reply. He said:

References

English male cyclists
1929 births
Living people
Place of birth missing (living people)
Sportspeople from Crawley